The women's sprint competition of the cycling events at the 2015 Pan American Games was held on July 18 and 19 at the Milton Velodrome in Milton, Ontario.

Schedule
All times are Eastern Standard Time (UTC-3).

Results

Qualification
Fastest 12 riders continue to the eighth finals.

Eighth finals
The winners of each advance to the quarterfinals, while the losers advance to the repechage

Repechage 
The winner of each advanced to the quarterfinals.

Quarterfinals

Race for 5th–8th Places

Semifinals

Finals

References

Track cycling at the 2015 Pan American Games
Women's sprint (track cycling)
Pan